Wedelia acapulcensis, commonly known as Acapulco wedelia, is a species of flowering plant in the family Asteraceae.  It is native to Texas in the United States, Mexico, and Central America.

Varieties
Wedelia acapulcensis var. acapulcensis
Wedelia acapulcensis var. hispida (Kunth) Strother (=Lipochaeta texana Torr. & A.Gray, W. hispida Kunth, W. texana (A.Gray) B.L.Turner, Zexmenia hispida (Kunth) A.Gray ex Small) – hairy wedelia, orange wedelia, orange zexmenia

References

External links

acapulcensis
Plants described in 1818
Flora of Central America
Flora of Mexico
Flora of Texas